Deck may refer to:

A level or platform

Buildings and structures
Deck (bridge), the roadway surface of a bridge
Deck (building), an outdoor floor attached to a building made of wood or wood-like material
Another name for a storey
The concrete or tile area surrounding a swimming pool
Deck arch bridge, a type of bridge
Observation deck, a platform situated upon a tall architectural structure or natural feature
Orthotropic deck
Roof deck, the framing and sheathing to which roofing material is applied

Transportation
Bus deck, referring to the number of passenger levels on a bus
Cockpit, also called a "flight deck"

Maritime
Deck (ship), a floor of a ship
Flight deck of an aircraft carrier

Audiovisual equipment
Cassette deck, a type of tape machine for playing and recording compact cassettes
Head unit
Phonograph turntable
Tape deck, a sound recording and playback device

People
Deck (surname)
Deck McGuire (born 1989), American baseball player

Other uses
Deck (cards), a collection of cards
Game deck, a video game system
Deck (news), a phrase, sentence or several sentences near the title of an article or story
Stage (theatre)
Steam Deck, a portable gaming computer
The flat surface of a skateboard
Deck Afta, a character from the anime Space Runaway Ideon

See also
 
 
Double decker (disambiguation)
Deque - Double-ended queue
Flight Deck (disambiguation)